Chan Koonchung (born 1952) is a Chinese science-fiction writer who has previously lived in Hong Kong, Taiwan, and the United States. He currently lives in Beijing. Chan also holds Canadian citizenship. He is the founder of Green Power (綠色力量), Green Garden Organic Farm (綠田園有機農場) and the Hong Kong Film Directors Association (香港電影導演會) among other organizations, and is currently on the international board of directors of Greenpeace. Previously, he worked as a reporter for the Hong Kong tabloid, The Star. In 1976 he co-founded City Magazine (號外) with Qiu Shiwen and Deng Xiaoyu and Hu Junyi. In the 1990s he worked as an overseas publisher for the mainland literary journal Dushu (读书）, published by the China Publishing Group (中国出版集团) and SDX Joint Publishing Company (生活读书新知三联书店). In 1991 he played the role of Professor Liu Yuebai in Yan Hao and Xu Ke's adaptation of Ah Cheng's 1984 novel, The Chess Master. His dystopian novel The Fat Years (2009) was published in English by Doubleday in 2011.

In his book, The Unbearable Dreamworld of Champa the Driver (2014), the Tibetan driver and lover of a Chinese businesswoman falls in love with her daughter. It is a satirical metaphor of the unbalanced relations between China and Tibet.

Biography
Koonchung was born in 1952 in Shanghai, China. Koonchung earned his BA from the University of Hong Kong and completed graduate study at Boston University.

Awards and honors
2013 Jan Michalski Prize for Literature, finalist, The Fat Years

References 

Chinese science fiction writers
Living people
1952 births
Chinese male novelists